Amerigo may refer to:

People
 Amerigo Dumini (1894–1967), Italian fascist activist
 Amerigo Gazaway (born 1986), American musician
 Amerigo Paradiso (born 1962), Italian footballer
 Amerigo Petrucci (1922–1983), Italian politician
 Amerigo Thodé (born 1950), Curaçaoan politician
 Amerigo Tot (1909–1984), Hungarian sculptor and actor
 Amerigo Vespucci (1454–1512), Italian merchant, explorer and cartographer after whom the American continents were named

Other uses
 Amerigo, a 1978 LP by Italian singer-songwriter Francesco Guccini
 "Amerigo", a song from the 2012 album Banga by Patti Smith
 Amerigo, Sinterklaas's white horse
 Amerigo Bonasera, a fictional character from The Godfather by Mario Puzo

See also
 Amalric
 Amaury (disambiguation)
 Arrigo
 Emmerich (disambiguation)
 Imre